Antonio C. Agpaoa (1939-1982) most well known as Tony Agpaoa was a Filipino practitioner of psychic surgery.

He worked in Manila. It was alleged that Agpaoa could remove tissue from the body of patients without making an incision. However, magicians and skeptics were convinced his feats were the result of conjuring tricks.

In 1968, Agpaoa was arrested and charged for fraud in the United States for pretending to mend a bone in a patients neck. American surgeon William A. Nolen has written "According to the A.M.A. he had separated hundreds of patients from their life savings and had cured no one."

Magician James Randi has noted that Agpaoa had his own appendix removed in a hospital in San Francisco, instead of visiting a psychic surgeon.

References

1939 births
1982 deaths
Filipino psychics
Spiritualists
Psychic surgeons